The men's moguls competition in freestyle skiing at the 2022 Winter Olympics were held on 3 February (qualification) and 5 February (final), at the Genting Snow Park in Zhangjiakou. Walter Wallberg of Sweden won the event. Mikaël Kingsbury of Canada became the silver medalist, and Ikuma Horishima from Japan took the bronze. For Wallberg and Horishima this is the first Olympic medal.

The defending champion was Mikaël Kingsbury. The 2018 silver medalist, Matt Graham and the bronze medalist, Daichi Hara, qualified for the Olympics as well. At the 2021–22 FIS Freestyle Ski World Cup, Kingsbury led the ranking before the Olympics, closely followed by Ikuma Horishima. Kingsbury is also the 2021 world champion, with Benjamin Cavet and Pavel Kolmakov being the silver and third medalists, respectively.

Qualification

A total of 30 moguls athletes qualified to compete at the games. For an athlete to compete they must have a minimum of 80.00 FIS points on the FIS Points List on January 17, 2022 and a top 30 finish in a World Cup event or at the FIS Freestyle Ski World Championships 2021. A country could enter a maximum of four athletes into the event.

Results

Qualifications

Qualifying 1
In the first qualifying round, the ten best athletes directly qualified for the final. The bottom twenty athletes go on to compete in the second qualification round.

Qualifying 2
In the second qualifying round, the ten best athletes qualify for the final based on that athletes best score from either the athlete's first or second qualifying run. The bottom ten athletes are eliminated.

Final

Final 1

Final 2

Final 3

References

Men's freestyle skiing at the 2022 Winter Olympics